Dur Anbesa is a reservoir located in the Hintalo Wajirat woreda of the Tigray Region in Ethiopia. The earthen dam that holds the reservoir was built in 2001 by SAERT.

Dam characteristics 
 Dam height: 18 metres
 Dam crest length: 605 metres
 Spillway width: 10 metres

Capacity 
 Original capacity: 900 000 m³
 Dead storage: 115 598 m³
 Reservoir area: 14 ha
In 2002, the life expectancy of the reservoir (the duration before it is filled with sediment) was estimated at 36 years.

Irrigation 
 Designed irrigated area: 61 ha

Environment 
The catchment of the reservoir is 10 km² large. The reservoir suffers from rapid siltation. Part of the water that could be used for irrigation is lost through seepage; the positive side-effect is that this contributes to groundwater recharge.

References 

Reservoirs in Ethiopia
2001 establishments in Ethiopia
Tigray Region